National Tertiary Route 708, or just Route 708 (or ) is a National Road Route of Costa Rica, located in the Alajuela province.

Description
In Alajuela province the route covers Sarchí canton (Sarchí Norte, Sarchí Sur, Toro Amarillo, San Pedro districts), Río Cuarto canton (Río Cuarto district).

References

Highways in Costa Rica